The House of Branicki (plural: Braniccy) was a Polish szlachta (nobility) family. Since Polish adjectives have different forms for the genders, Branicka is the form for a female family member.

History
The Branicki family, also called the "Griffin Clan" (Gryfici), was a magnate family, originating from Branice and Ruszcza in the Kraków Voivodeship. One of the most prominent members of the family was Field and Great Crown Hetman Jan Klemens Gryf Branicki. Jan was one of the most powerful and influential magnates in Poland during the 18th century. He was the owner of 12 cities, 257 villages, 17 palaces and two primeval forests.

In 1726, he built the Branicki Palace, the "Versailles of Podlasie". He also laid out the central part of the town of Białystok with its triangular market. He started in the King's election of 1763–1764, but was beaten by his brother-in-law, Stanisław Poniatowski.

Coat of arms
The Branicki family used the Gryf coat of arms.

Notable members
 Grzegorz Branicki (1534−1595), Łowczy, Burgrave of Kraków, married Katarzyna Kotwicz h. Kotwicz 
 Jan Branicki (c. 1568−1612), courtier, Łowczy of Kraków, castellan of Żarnów, married Anna Myszkowska h. Jastrzębiec
 Stanisław Branicki (1474-1520), Miecznik of the Crown, married Helena Tarło h. Topór, daughter of Jan Tarło h. Topór
 Jan Klemens Branicki (died 1657), podkomorzy of Kraków, married Anna Beata Wapowska h. Nieczuja
 Jan Klemens Branicki (c. 1624−1673), Court Marshall of the Crown, married Aleksandra Katarzyna Czarniecka h. Łodzia, daughter of Hetman Stefan Czarniecki h. Łodzia
 Stefan Mikołaj Branicki (1640–1709), Great Stolnik of the Crown, Voivode of Podlasie, married Princes Katarzyna Scholastyka Sapieha h. Lis, daughter of Hetman Prince Jan Kazimierz Sapieha h. Lis
 Jan Klemens Branicki (1689–1771), Field and Great Crown Hetman, the last male representative of the Branicki of Gryf family. He married firstly Princess Katarzyna Barbara Radziwiłł h. Trąby, granddaughter of Hetman Michał Kazimierz Radziwiłł, secondly Barbara Szembek and thirdly Princess Izabella Poniatowska h. Ciołek, sister of King Stanisław August Poniatowski
 Konstancja Tekla Branicka (1658–1720), married to Johann Heinrich von Altenbockum, mother of Ursula Katharina Lubomirska
 Anna Branicka (died 1639), married to Count Sebastian Lubomirski Jennah Karthes de Branicka, the German TV presenter and reporter of the Middle East with Lithuanian ancestors,  
Zenona Branicka (born in Warsaw 1941), Protests of 1968, belongs among others, to the last actual descendants of the noble family "Branicki". The Branicki family has made its name in the Polish history.

Palaces

References